Pahñú o Pañhú is an archeological site in Tecozautla, State of Hidalgo. It is a settlement from Xajay culture developed between 300 and 1100 years ago. Apparently it is the heir to the Preclassic period of Chupícuaro culture, in El Bajío, and is related to origin of the Otomis of Mezquital Valley.

Name

History
The archeological site Pañhú was discovered over Hualtepec hill or La Mesilla, near Tecozautla Valley, was an Otomi settlement of Xajay Culture, at the same time as the Teotihuacan Culture.

Work started in 2007 by INAH, and it was open to the public in 2015.

See also
Mezquital Valley

References

Archaeological sites in Hidalgo (state)
Otomi sites